Harold Blaine Lindgren (June 26, 1939 – October 5, 2019) was an American sprinter who competed mainly in the 110 m hurdles. He won this event at the 1963 Pan American Games, but then was beaten by Hayes Jones by a small margin in several competitions, including the 1964 national championships and 1964 Olympics, where Lindgren placed second. He graduated from Utah University and worked for the sheriff's department in Salt Lake City, Utah.

Blaine Lindgren died on October 5, 2019, at the age of 80.

References

External links
 
 
 

1939 births
2019 deaths
Track and field athletes from Salt Lake City
American male hurdlers
Athletes (track and field) at the 1963 Pan American Games
Athletes (track and field) at the 1964 Summer Olympics
Olympic silver medalists for the United States in track and field
Medalists at the 1964 Summer Olympics
Pan American Games gold medalists for the United States
Pan American Games medalists in athletics (track and field)
Medalists at the 1963 Pan American Games